Anna Christie is a 1930 German-language film adapted from the 1921 Eugene O'Neill play of the same title and filmed following the release of the English-language original version of the same adaptation earlier the same year. Both versions feature leading actress Greta Garbo. In the early years of sound films, Hollywood studios produced foreign-language versions of some of their films using the same sets and sometimes the same costumes, with native speakers of the language usually replacing some or all of the original cast. The German-language version of Anna Christie is one of the few that survives.

The film was produced by Metro-Goldwyn-Mayer at their Culver City, California studio in July and August 1930 (the English-language original had been filmed there in October and November 1929). It premiered in Cologne, Germany on December 2, 1930. Garbo is the only cast member appearing in both versions and looks noticeably different in the two. The German dialog was written by Walter Hasenclever and Frank Reicher, for the most part very closely following Frances Marion's original adaptation. The film was directed by Jacques Feyder using the same cinematographer, Garbo favorite William H. Daniels, but a different crew.

Plot
Chris Christofferson (Hans Junkermann), the alcoholic skipper of a coal barge in New York, receives a letter from his estranged twenty-year-old daughter Anna "Christie" Christofferson (Greta Garbo). She tells him that she'll be leaving Minnesota to stay with him. Chris had left Anna 15 years ago to be raised by relatives who live on a farm in the countryside of St. Paul and has not seen her since.

Anna Christie arrives, an emotionally wounded woman with a dishonorable, hidden past, having worked as a prostitute for two years, after fleeing the farm where she had been greatly overworked and then raped. She moves to the barge to live with her father, who, one night, rescues Matt (Theo Shall) from the sea. Anna and Matt fall in love and she has the best days of her life. However, when Matt proposes marriage, she is reluctant, haunted by her past. Matt insists and compels Anna to tell him the truth.

Cast (in credits order)
 Greta Garbo as Anna Christie
 Theo Shall as Matt Burke
 Hans Junkermann as Chris Christofferson
 Salka Viertel as Marthy Owens
 Herman Bing as Larry (uncredited)

Home media
Though the English-language version of Anna Christie has been released numerous times worldwide on DVD, the German version is only available on a subtitled US DVD. The latter was sourced from an inferior print; a much better print without subtitles exists.

Notes

References

External links
 
 

1930 films
1930 drama films
American drama films
American black-and-white films
Films about prostitution in the United States
American films based on plays
Films based on works by Eugene O'Neill
Films directed by Jacques Feyder
1930s German-language films
American multilingual films
Metro-Goldwyn-Mayer films
Seafaring films
Films with screenplays by Frances Marion
1930 multilingual films
1930s American films